California Gothic is a novel by Dennis Etchison published by Robinson Publishing in 1995.

Plot summary
California Gothic is the tale of a seemingly normal man named Dan, and a young woman named Jude who has apparently come back from the dead to ruin his life.

Reception
Andy Butcher reviewed California Gothic for Arcane magazine, rating it a 7 out of 10 overall. Butcher comments that "California Gothic is one of those horror stories that uses atmosphere very effectively, building up a vague sense of unease rather than just shocking you with gore. In doing so it breaks away from many of the weary traditions of the genre, all of which prevents it from becoming just another horror novel."

Reviews
Review by Edward Bryant (1995) in Locus, #415 August 1995 
Review by Gahan Wilson (1995) in Realms of Fantasy, October 1995

References

1995 novels